Akhat (Alexander) Khafizovich (Sergeevich) Bragin (1953 — 15 October 1995) was a Ukrainian businessman of Volga Tatar descent. He was a mafia figure of the Donetsk Oblast and later the president of the football club Shakhtar Donetsk until his death.

Biography
Akhat Hafizovich Bragin was born in 1953 in the Kuibyshevskyi Raion of Donetsk city, Ukrainian SSR. Before he became the president of Shakhtar Donetsk, he was also a butcher at a local market in Oktyabrsky Raion.

Education
Donetsk Soviet Trade Institute (today Donetsk National University of Economy and Trade), dropped out.

Convictions
 24 November 1971 – convicted (the Criminal Code of Ukraine) by the Kuibyshev District Court of Donetsk to a conditional year of imprisonment with correctional term of 2 years without confiscation of property

Personal life
Bragin had a wife and two children.

Assassination and attempts
An attempt to kill Bragin took place on 19 March 1994 at Pisky (Bragin's hometown). Pisky, Yasynuvata Raion is a rural settlement of Yasynuvata Raion, just to the west from the Donetsk International Airport. A group of bandits from the Ryabin-Kushnir gang (run by Yevhen Kushnir and Anatoliy Ryabi) opened fire on Bragin's pigeon coop while Bragin was visiting his birds. Bragin survived the attempt.

Bragin died in a bomb attack on Sunday 15 October 1995 at the Shakhtar Stadium in Donetsk. After this event, Rinat Akhmetov became president and chairman of Shaktar Donetsk. The reason for Akhat's murder was his business dealings. Known in the criminal underworld as 'Alik the Greek', his organization got into conflicts with several others. The investigation into his death made little progress until the confession of a rival gangster, which led to the arrest and imprisonment of former policeman Vyacheslav Synenko.

Legacy
In honor of Akhat Bragin, the mosque of Donetsk is called Ahat Jami.

See also
 List of unsolved murders
 Yevhen Shcherban

References

External links
 Criminal Donetsk: a travel guide of the most notorious criminal locations of the city in the 90s
 Donetsk mafia
 Attempted on Rinat Akhmetov. True Story of the oligarch
 The name of Bragin is still remembered in Donetsk
 Akhat Bragin on the website genshtab
 Donetsk Wars. Episode 1. "Panorama weekly". 2002-06-12.

1953 births
1995 deaths
FC Shakhtar Donetsk non-playing staff
Male murder victims
Businesspeople from Donetsk
People murdered by Russian-speaking organized crime
People murdered in Ukraine
20th-century Ukrainian businesspeople
Ukrainian gangsters
Ukrainian murder victims
Ukrainian people of Tatar descent
Unsolved murders in Ukraine
Volga Tatar people
Deaths by explosive device